Efrem Borisovich Flaks (— 17 December 1982) was a Soviet singer (bass). A holder of the title of Meritorious Artist of the RSFSR since 1960. He graduated from the Leningrad Conservatory (vocal class) in 1936, from 1939 to 1942 and from 1950 to 1970 worked as a soloist at the Leningrad Philharmonia, from 1943 to 1950 at the Leningrad Radio. He was the original performer of numerous songs by composers Vasily Solovyov-Sedoi, Matvey Blanter, Boris Mokrousov, etc.

References 

1909 births
1982 deaths
Soviet male singers
20th-century Russian male singers
20th-century Russian singers